Original Music from the Soundtrack to Piñero is the soundtrack to the 2001 film Piñero by producer Kip Hanrahan. Released in March 2002, the album includes performances by Horacio "El Negro" Hernández, Robby Ameen, and Milton Cardona.

Critical reception 
The Guardian reviewed the album, giving it five stars and saying, "The album cleverly reinvents several perennially engaging musics: noir atmospherics; Puerto Rican and Afro-Cuban groove fundamentals; Bitches Brew-era space music; Latin boogaloo."

All About Jazz reviewer John Eyles said in a review, "The predominant sound is a low-key, noir-ish Latin jazz fusion, dominated by electric bass, percussion and trumpet, which creates an oppressive sense of imminent danger. The film stars Benjamin Bratt, who voices some atmospheric scene-setting sections of the album; these are used sparingly enough so as not to intrude, but to enhance the air of sleaze and menace. In a large ensemble cast of musicians, key performances come from pianist Edsel Gomez, bass guitarist Fernandez Saunders and particularly trumpeter Jerry Gonzalez."

Jim Trageser reviewed the album for the Summer 2004 issue of Turbula, saying, "And so the music is New York – smart and sophisticated and dark and seedy and ebullient and tired and hard and sentimental, all at the same time. With a beat, always a beat, because New York is a city that lives to its rhythms."

Track listing

Personnel 
 Chocolate Armenteros – trumpet
 Jerry Gonzalez – trumpet, percussion (quinto)
 Papo Vasquez – trombone
 Mario Rivera – baritone saxophone
 Mauricio Smith – flute
 Alfredo Triff – violin
 Lysandro Arias – piano
 Edsel Gomez – piano, electric piano
 Peter Scherer – keyboards
 Leo Nocentelli – guitar
 Andy Gonzalez – bass
 Fernando Saunders –  bass guitar
 Robby Ameen – drums, congas, percussion
 Horacio "El Negro" Hernandez – drums, percussion
 Kip Hanrahan – percussion
 Richie Flores – congas
 Paoli Mejias – congas, percussion (quinto)
 Carlos Mestre – congas
 Edgardo Miranda – cuatro
 Yomo Toro – cuatro
 Vincente George – guiro
 Amadito Valdez – timbales
 Orlando Rios – vocals, batá drum
 Abraham Rodriguez – voice, batá drum, claves, congas
 Frankie Rodriguez – lead vocals
 Benjamin Bratt – vocals
 Felix Sanabria – vocals, batá drum

References

2002 soundtrack albums
Kip Hanrahan albums